Taggart is a surname of Scottish and Irish origin. It is a reduction of the surnames MacTaggart and McTaggart, which are anglicisations of the Gaelic Mac an t-Sagairt, meaning "son of the priest". The name is sometimes written Teggart or Tegart or Tagart.

List of persons with the surname Taggart 
 Adam Taggart (born 1993), Australian footballer
 Andrew Taggart (born 1989), American musician (The Chainsmokers)
 Ben Taggart (1889–1947), American actor
 Sir Charles Tegart (1881–1946), British police officer and engineer
 Cynthia Taggart (1801–1849), American poet
 Edward Tagart (1804–1858), English Unitarian divine
 Errol Taggart (1895–1940), Canadian director and film editor
 Gerry Taggart (born 1970), British professional footballer
 James Gordon Taggart (1892–1974), Canadian civil servant and politician
 Jeremy Taggart (born 1973), drummer for Canadian band Our Lady Peace
 Joan Taggart (1917-2003), Australian politician
 Joseph Taggart (1867–1938), United States congressman
 Kelly E. Taggart (1932–2014), American admiral and civil engineer, second director of the National Oceanic and Atmospheric Administration Commissioned Officer Corps
 Millee Taggart, American actress
 Noel Tagart (1878–1913), English cricketer
 Phil Taggart (born 1987), Northern Irish radio presenter
 Rick Taggart, American politician from Colorado
 Samuel Taggart (1754–1825), United States congressman
 Scott Taggart (born 1991), Scottish footballer
 Shawn Taggart (born 1985), American basketball player
 Tamara Taggart (born 1968), Canadian television presenter
 Thomas Taggart (1856–1929), American politician 
 Willie Taggart (born 1976), American football coach

See also
Taggart (disambiguation) for fictional characters with the surname Taggart

References

Anglicised Scottish Gaelic-language surnames
Surnames of Ulster-Scottish origin

fr:Taggart